The Stardust Awards was an award ceremony for Hindi movies, which was sponsored by Stardust magazine. Here is a list of the award winners and the films for which they won. The first ceremony was held in 2004 for films released in 2003. The last awards ceremony happened in 2016, with several Discontinued, Intermittent and Special Awards.

Awards

Editor's Choice 
 Film of the Year
 Filmmaker of the Year
 Performer of the Year - Male
 Performer of the Year - Female

Main Awards 
 Best Film of the Year - Since 2003
 Best Supporting Actor - Since 2003
 Best Supporting Actress - Since 2003
 Best Director - Since 2009
 Best Actor - Since 2009
 Best Actress - Since 2009
Best Playback – Male- Since 2014
 Best Playback – Female- Since 2014

Discontinued, Intermittent and Special Awards
Film
 Best Film 
 Best Film – Comedy or Romance
 Best Film – Drama
 Best Film – Thriller or Action
 Hottest Film of The Year

Direction
 Best Director – Comedy or Romance
 Best Director – Thriller or Action
 Best Director – Drama
 Hottest New Director

Acting
 Best Actor in a Comedy or Romance
 Best Actress in a Comedy or Romance
 Best Actor in a Drama
 Best Actress in a Drama
 Best Actor in a Thriller or Action
 Best Actress in a Thriller or Action
 Superstar of Tomorrow – Male
 Superstar of Tomorrow – Female
 Best Breakthrough Performance – Male 
 Best Breakthrough Performance – Female

Music
 Standout Performance by a Music Director
 Standout Performance by a Lyricist
 New Musical Sensation – Male
 New Musical Sensation – Female

Special awards
 Best Director of the Millennium – Raj Kapoor (posthumously)
 Best Artists of the Millennium – Amitabh Bachchan and Nargis (posthumously)
 Pride of Film Industry Award – Rajesh Khanna, Shatrughan Sinha, Feroz Khan, Amitabh Bachchan and Vyjayanthimala
 Best Singer of the Millennium - Mohammed Rafi (posthumously)
 Voice of the Millennium - Lata Mangeshkar
 Exciting New Face –Isha Koppikar(2003), Sameera Reddy(2004), Lara Dutta(2005) Ayesha Kapur(2006), Shriya Saran (2009), Jacqueline Fernandez (2010)
 Style Icon of The Year - Deepika Padukone (2012), Bipasha Basu (2013), Jacqueline Fernandez (2014), Parineeti Chopra (2015), Shraddha Kapoor (2018)
 Star of the Century - Amitabh Bachchan (2013)

See also 
 Bollywood
 Cinema of India

References 

 
Bollywood film awards